The Gallovidian was an illustrated magazine published in Dalbeattie, Galloway, Scotland, between 1899 and 1949. The subtitle was An Illustrated Southern Counties Magazine. The magazine was published on a quarterly basis. In 1906 the publisher was J.Maxwell & Sons company. The frequent articles published in the magazine was about poetry, politics and history.

One contributor was J G Carter (1856-1909)  whose nom de plume was "Theodore Mayne". He was a great influence on the young Neil Gunn when the latter was living in St. John's Town of Dalry.

The paper is referenced in Dorothy Sayers' 1931 novel Five Red Herrings, which takes place in Galloway. In one episode Lord Peter Wimsey, after eating a good meal, is "dreaming over some old numbers of The Gallovidian".

References

External links
 The Golden Years of the Gallovidian
 Article including an extensive quote from The Gallovidian (1906)

Quarterly magazines published in the United Kingdom
Defunct magazines published in Scotland
Magazines established in 1899
Magazines disestablished in 1949
Magazines published in Scotland
Poetry literary magazines